The Falknis is a mountain in the Rätikon range of the Alps, located on the border between Liechtenstein and Switzerland. It is 8406 ft. (2562 m) at its highest peak.

The nearest locality is Balzers.

In literature 
The Falknis is one of two mountains named in Johanna Spyri's 1881 novel Heidi. The title character describes them to her grandfather after having seen them both from the meadow where the goats are taken daily to graze, and he tells her their names. The other mountain is the Schesaplana, some 11 km away to the east.

References

External links
 Falknis on Hikr

Mountains of the Alps
Mountains of Switzerland
Mountains of Liechtenstein
Liechtenstein–Switzerland border
Mountains of Graubünden
Two-thousanders of Switzerland
Fläsch